Nkukoli (Ekuri, Lokoli, Lokukoli) is an Upper Cross River language of Nigeria.

References

Languages of Nigeria
Upper Cross River languages